Jan Michalski Prize for Literature (French: Prix Jan Michalski) is a Swiss literary prize for any work of fiction or non-fiction published anywhere in the world in any language. It is meant to recognize authors from around the world and world literature in general. The jury is multicultural and multilingual in composition.

The award was launched October 2009 and the first winner was announced November 2010. The winner receives . The authors of finalists are invited for a three-month period of residence in the Maison de l'écriture.

The prize was created by the Jan Michalski Foundation for Writing and Literature (Fondation Jan Michalski pour l’Ecriture et la Littérature), founded in 2004 at the initiative of Vera Michalski-Hoffmann in memory of her husband Jan Michalski. It is located in Montricher, Switzerland.

Honorees

Notes

External links
 Jan Michalski Prize for Literature, official website
 Prize entry rules

International literary awards
Swiss literary awards
Fiction awards
Non-fiction literary awards
Awards established in 2009
2009 establishments in Switzerland